There are at least 23 named lakes and reservoirs in Ashley County, Arkansas.

Lakes
Anthony Lake, el.  
Clear Lake, el.  
Coffee Lake, el.  
Cooley Lake, el.  
Lake Enterprise, el.  
Lake Georgia Pacific, el.  
Lake Lingo, el.  
Marais Saline, el.  
Mossy Lake, el.  
Mud Lake, el.  
Redeye Lake, el.  
Sanders Lake, el.  
Wilson Brake, el.

Reservoirs
Lake Georgia-Pacific, el.  
Lake Granpus, el.  
Lucas Pond, el.  
Mill Pond, el.  
Ouachita River Reservoir, el.  
Riley Lake, el.  
Shiloh Lake, el.  
Stone Lake, el.  
Wilson Brake Reservoir, el.  
Young Lake, el.

See also
 List of lakes in Arkansas

Notes

Bodies of water of Ashley County, Arkansas
Ashley